Pedro Perino (born 27 May 2005) is a Portuguese-Mozambican racing driver who is set to compete for DKR Engineering in the European Le Mans Series.

Early career

Karting 
Perino began karting in Mozambique, before starting to race in competitions when he moved to Portugal in 2017. He raced karts until 2020, when he drove for KR Motorsport in the OK category of the European and World championships.

Lower formulae 
Having tested Formula 4 machinery in Cremona at the back end of 2020, the Mozambican would make his car racing debut, driving for DR Formula RP Motorsport in the final round of the Italian F4 Championship.

The following season, Perino remained with the team to race in Italian F4 on a full-time basis. However, a disappointing first half of the season led to a switch to the race-winning US Racing outfit, with whom Perino would score a best finish of tenth at the Red Bull Ring.

Perino returned to US Racing for the 2022 season, where he parnered Alex Dunne, Kacper Sztuka, Nikhil Bohra and Marcus Amand. One points finish, a sixth place during a chaotic Race 1 in Monza, was all the Mozambican could muster up, which left him 19th in the standings behind all of his teammates.

Sportscar career

2023: Move to LMP3 
For 2023, Perino joined DKR Engineering in the LMP3 class of the European Le Mans Series for his first venture into endurance racing.

Karting record

Karting career summary

Racing record

Racing career summary 

† As Perino was a guest driver, he was ineligible to score points.

Complete Italian F4 Championship results 
(key) (Races in bold indicate pole position) (Races in italics indicate fastest lap)

Complete European Le Mans Series results
(key) (Races in bold indicate pole position; results in italics indicate fastest lap)

Notes

References

External links 

 

2005 births
Living people
Mozambican sportspeople
Portuguese racing drivers
Karting World Championship drivers
Italian F4 Championship drivers
ADAC Formula 4 drivers
European Le Mans Series drivers
US Racing drivers
RP Motorsport drivers
People from Oeiras, Portugal